Ryan Taylor (born June 15, 1990) is an American professional soccer player.

Career statistics

References

External links 
 USL Profile

1990 births
Living people
People from Midlothian, Virginia
American soccer players
Fredericksburg Hotspur players
Richmond Kickers players
Radford Highlanders men's soccer players
Association football goalkeepers
Soccer players from Virginia
USL League Two players
USL Championship players